In mathematics, the infinite series  is an example of one of the first infinite series to be summed in the history of mathematics; it was used by Archimedes circa 250–200 BC.  As it is a geometric series with first term  and common ratio , its sum is

Visual demonstrations

The series  lends itself to some particularly simple visual demonstrations because a square and a triangle both divide into four similar pieces, each of which contains  the area of the original.

In the figure on the left, if the large square is taken to have area 1, then the largest black square has area  ×  = . Likewise, the second largest black square has area , and the third largest black square has area . The area taken up by all of the black squares together is therefore , and this is also the area taken up by the gray squares and the white squares. Since these three areas cover the unit square, the figure demonstrates that

Archimedes' own illustration, adapted at top, was slightly different, being closer to the equation

See below for details on Archimedes' interpretation.

The same geometric strategy also works for triangles, as in the figure on the right: if the large triangle has area 1, then the largest black triangle has area , and so on. The figure as a whole has a self-similarity between the large triangle and its upper sub-triangle. A related construction making the figure similar to all three of its corner pieces produces the Sierpiński triangle.

Proof by Archimedes

Archimedes encounters the series in his work Quadrature of the Parabola. He is finding the area inside a parabola by the method of exhaustion, and he gets a series of triangles; each stage of the construction adds an area  times the area of the previous stage. His desired result is that the total area is  times the area of the first stage. To get there, he takes a break from parabolas to introduce an algebraic lemma:

Proposition 23. Given a series of areas , of which A is the greatest, and each is equal to four times the next in order, then

Archimedes proves the proposition by first calculating

On the other hand,

Subtracting this equation from the previous equation yields

and adding A to both sides gives the desired result.

Today, a more standard phrasing of Archimedes' proposition is that the partial sums of the series  are:

This form can be proved by multiplying both sides by 1 −  and observing that all but the first and the last of the terms on the left-hand side of the equation cancel in pairs. The same strategy works for any finite geometric series.

The limit
Archimedes' Proposition 24 applies the finite (but indeterminate) sum in Proposition 23 to the area inside a parabola by a double reductio ad absurdum. He does not quite take the limit of the above partial sums, but in modern calculus this step is easy enough:

Since the sum of an infinite series is defined as the limit of its partial sums,

Notes

References

 Page images at  HTML with figures and commentary at 

 

Geometric series
Proof without words